Ilya Alekseyevich Dolmatov (born 23 June 1985) is a former Russian professional footballer.

Club career
He made his professional debut in the Russian Second Division in 2002 for FC Sportakademklub Moscow.

External links

References

1985 births
Footballers from Moscow
Living people
Russian footballers
Association football forwards
FC Shinnik Yaroslavl players
FC Sibir Novosibirsk players
FC Kuban Krasnodar players
FC Krasnodar players
FC Sokol Saratov players
FC Tosno players
Russian Premier League players
FC Olimp-Dolgoprudny players
FC Sportakademklub Moscow players